Black Jack is the nickname of the following people:

 John Vernou Bouvier III (1891–1957), father of Jacqueline Kennedy Onassis
 Jack Blackham (1854–1932), Australian cricketer
 Jack Brabham (1926–2014), Australian motor racing world champion
 Jack Burdock (1852–1932), American Major League Baseball player and manager
 Black Jack Christian (1871–1897), American western outlaw 
 John Davidson (general) (1825–1881), American Civil War Union Army brigadier general and Indian fighter
 Frederick Galleghan (1897–1971), Australian Army major general
 Tom Ketchum (1863–1901), American western outlaw
 John A. Logan (1826–1886), American Civil War Union major general and Illinois politician
 John McCauley (1899–1989), senior commander in the Royal Australian Air Force (RAAF)
 Jack McDowell (born 1966), American Major League Baseball pitcher
 John McEwen (1900–1980), 18th Prime Minister of Australia
 John J. Pershing (1860–1948), United States Army general
 Jean Schramme (1929–1988), Belgian mercenary and planter
 Jack Stewart (ice hockey) (1917–1983), Canadian National Hockey League player

See also 

 
 

Lists of people by nickname